Operation Pike was the code-name for a strategic bombing plan overseen by UK Air Commodore John Slessor against the USSR by the Anglo-French alliance. British military planning against the Soviet Union occurred during the first two years of the Second World War, when, despite Soviet neutrality, the British and French concluded that the German–Soviet pact made Stalin an accomplice of Hitler. The plan was designed to destroy the Soviet oil industry to cause the collapse of the Soviet economy and deprive Germany of Soviet resources.

Planning
After the conclusion of the German-Soviet Pact, Britain and France became concerned that the Soviets supplied oil to the Germans.

Planning began soon after the Soviet invasion of Poland during September 1939 and increased after Stalin began the Winter War against Finland in November 1939. The plan included the seizure of northern Norway and Sweden and an advance into Finland to confront Soviet troops and naval forces in the Baltic Sea. The plan was considered costly and ineffective in dealing with the German threat and so was reduced to the seizure of Norway and the Swedish iron ore mines. British and French politicians were for the continuation of the conflict between Finland and the USSR to legitimize their attack on the Soviets.

Planners identified the dependence by Germany on oil imports from the Soviets as a vulnerability that could be exploited. Despite initial opposition by some politicians, the French government ordered General Maurice Gamelin to commence a "plan of possible intervention with the view of destroying Russian oil exploitation", and US Ambassador Bullit informed US President Franklin Roosevelt that the French considered that air attacks by the French Air Forces in Syria against Baku to be "the most efficient way to weaken the Soviet Union". According to the report by General Gamelin that was submitted to the French prime minister on 22 February 1940, an oil shortage would cripple the Red Army, the Soviet Air Force and Soviet collective farm machinery, which would make possible widespread famine and even the collapse of the Soviet government:

An important source of raw materials would also be denied to Germany by the destruction of the oil fields.

Serious preparation by the British began after the end of the Winter War in March 1940. By April, plans to attack oil production facilities in the Caucasian towns of Baku, Batum and Grozny were complete. Bombers were to be flown from bases in Iran, Turkey and Syria in "Western Air Plan 106", which was codenamed "Operation Pike". The French proposed accelerating the planning, but the British were more cautious for fear of a possible German-Soviet alliance if the allies attack the Soviets.

The Soviet government anticipated Allied attacks, and from 25–29 March, the command of the Transcaucasian Military District performed the following map exercise. According to the scenario, the "black" forces, continuing their actions against the "brown" forces at the Western Front, attacked in co-operation with "blue" and "green" forces; they were repelled by the "reds" in the Caucasus, who then started a counteroffensive towards Erzurum and Tebriz.

Some scholars do not take the British plans of attack seriously and regard them as mere contingency plans. However, the Soviet historian  noted that the British and French military staff had developed strategic plans for assaulting the USSR from the south but that neither government had a political decision to invade.

Reconnaissance missions
During March 1940, after the end of the Winter War, the British performed secret reconnaissance flights to photograph areas inside the USSR by using high-altitude, high-speed stereoscopic photography pioneered by Sidney Cotton.

Using specially modified and unmarked Lockheed Model 12 Electra Junior aircraft painted a special blue camouflage scheme developed by Cotton, who commanded the RAF Photographic Development Unit (PDU), the Secret Intelligence Service launched high-altitude reconnaissance flights from RAF Habbaniya, a Royal Air Force station in Iraq. One such mission was flown on 30 March 1940. Flying over the mountainous region of southeastern Kurdistan, in Iranian airspace, across the coast of the Caspian Sea and then north towards Baku, the flight entered Soviet airspace at 11:45 after a four-hour flight. Loitering for an hour and making six photographic runs with its  aerial camera, the aircraft left Baku at 12:45 and returned to RAF Habbaniya.

Another reconnaissance sortie was flown on 5 April from RAF Habbaniya, this time crossing Turkish airspace to reach Batumi. The flight encountered Soviet anti-aircraft fire, and a Soviet fighter attempted an interception. The British had obtained everything that they needed for interpreting photographs and mapping the Soviet petroleum facilities.

Preparations for air campaign
Analysis of the photography by the PDU revealed that the oil infrastructure in Baku and Batumi were particularly vulnerable to air attack, as both could be approached from the sea and so the more difficult target of Grozny would be bombed first to exploit the element of surprise. Oil fields were to be attacked with incendiary bombs, and tests conducted at the Royal Arsenal at Woolwich revealed that light oil storage tanks at the oil processing plants could be detonated with high explosives.

As of 1 April, four squadrons comprising 48 Bristol Blenheim Mk IV bombers were transferred to the Middle East Command and were supplemented with a number of single-engined Wellesley bombers for night missions. A French force of 65 Martin Maryland bombers and a supplementary force of 24 Farman F.222 heavy bombers were allocated for night operations during the campaign. The French were preparing new air fields in Syria that were expected to be ready by 15 May.

German capture of Allied plans
The German Blitzkrieg in Western Europe from 10 May 1940 and the swift subsequent Fall of France derailed the plans. The Germans captured a train stalled at the village of La Charité-sur-Loire that contained boxes of secret documents evacuated from Paris. Among them were documents dealing with Operation Pike. On 4 July, the Deutsches Nachrichtenbüro (German News Bureau) released excerpts of the captured documents relating to Operation Pike and asserted:

The strategic bombing campaign against Soviet targets was postponed and eventually abandoned.

Revival against Germany
After the attack on the USSR by Germany with its Operation Barbarossa in June 1941, Operation Pike was revived as a contingency plan to be invoked if German forces occupied the Caucasian oil fields.

Problems
Although the British and the French pursued the operation to weaken the Germans and the Soviets, the actual outcome would likely have been more damaging for the Allies. If the attack had occurred prior to the invasion of France, Britain may have had the prospect of fighting a German-Soviet alliance alone if France was defeated, which also would have delayed the almost-inevitable German-Soviet conflict. If it were resurrected in 1942 to deny oil fields in the Caucasus to the advancing Germans if the Soviets could not sabotage them, success in destroying them would have harmed the Soviets more.

Operation Pike was motivated largely by desire for action and avoiding massive, direct confrontation during the Phoney War, the overconfidence of strategic bombing enthusiasts, and the idea of harming both Germany and the USSR simultaneously.

See also
 Anglo-Soviet Agreement (1941)
 Anglo-Soviet Treaty (1942)
 Franco-British plans for intervention in the Winter War
 Franco-Soviet Treaty of Mutual Assistance
 Operation Catherine
 Operation Unthinkable

References

Further reading

External links
 That Time Britain and France Almost Bombed the Soviet Union by  Patrick Osborn 

Cancelled military operations of World War II
Cancelled military operations involving the United Kingdom
France–Soviet Union relations
Soviet Union–United Kingdom relations